Seven Years or 7 Years may refer to:

 7 Years (film), 2006 French drama film
 "7 Years" (Lukas Graham song), 2015
 "7 Years" (Superheist song), 2002
 Seven Years, a song from Natalie Merchant's album Tigerlily
 Seven Years (album), by Mark Mallman
 Seven Years: 1998–2005, album by ATB
 Seven Years (1998–2005), DVD by ATB, released with the special edition of the album
 "Seven Years", a song by Level 42 on the album Guaranteed
 "Seven Years", a song by Norah Jones on the album Come Away with Me
 "Seven Years", a song by Saosin on the EP Translating the Name
 "7 Years", a song by Everlast on the album Whitey Ford Sings the Blues

See also 
 Seven Year Itch (disambiguation)
 Seven Year War (disambiguation)
 7 (number)